The 2004 Grand Prix SAR La Princesse Lalla Meryem was a women's tennis tournament played on outdoor clay courts in Casablanca, Morocco that was part of the Tier V category of the 2004 WTA Tour. It was the fourth edition of the tournament and was held from 5 April until 11 April 2004. First-seeded Émilie Loit won the singles title and earned $16,000 first-prize money.

Finals

Singles

 Émilie Loit defeated  Ľudmila Cervanová 6–2, 6–2
 It was Loit's first singles title of her career.

Doubles

 Marion Bartoli /  Émilie Loit defeated   Els Callens /  Katarina Srebotnik 6–4, 6–2

External links
 ITF tournament edition details
 Tournament draws

Grand Prix Sar La Princesse Lalla Meryem
Morocco Open
2004 in Moroccan tennis